{{DISPLAYTITLE:C10H20O2}}
The molecular formula C10H20O2 may refer to:

 Decanoic acid
 Ethyl octanoate
 Hydroxycitronellal
 p-Menthane-3,8-diol
 Paramenthane hydroperoxide
 Neodecanoic acid
 Octyl acetate
 Pentyl pentanoate
 Terpin